Adam Roarke (born Richard Jordan Gerler, August 8, 1937 – April 27, 1996) was an American actor and film director.

Life and career
Roarke was born in Brooklyn, New York, where he was a street gang member during his youth. His father was a vaudeville comedian and his mother was a chorus line dancer and showgirl.

Roarke began his acting career under the name Jordan Gerler and then Jordan Grant; however, when he signed on with Universal Studios in 1957, he was told that he needed to change the name, because the studios already had one Mr. Grant (Cary Grant) under contract.  Roarke appeared in a number of television series during the late 1950s and early 1960s, including the role of Communications Officer Garrison in the original Star Trek pilot. He appeared in a string of AIP biker pictures along with Peter Fonda, Jack Nicholson, and Bruce Dern in the late 1960s, beginning with Hells Angels on Wheels (1967), and culminating with The Losers (subsequently retitled Nam's Angels) in 1970.  In 1974, Roarke appeared in the financially successful car chase film Dirty Mary, Crazy Larry, with Fonda and Susan George, a role which showcased his range of acting skills.

His breakout role came in 1980 when he portrayed Raymond Bailey, a self-important leading man whose stunt double was played by Steve Railsback in The Stunt Man. Peter O'Toole befriended Roarke during filming, and the two became drinking pals. Unfortunately, Roarke was unable to keep up with O’Toole, and was hospitalized with delirium tremens before shooting had concluded. Word spread around Hollywood quickly, and Roarke had difficulty finding work as a result. However, an offer to work on a low-budget independent film brought him to Austin, Texas, in 1982. At the time, Texas had a burgeoning movie industry—billing itself as the "Third Coast"—but lacked any real opportunities for aspiring film actors to learn their craft from industry veterans. Recognizing this need, Roarke opened the "Film Actors Lab" in the Dallas Communications Complex at the Studios in Las Colinas. "Graduates" of his program include Darryl Cox, Benton Jennings, Lar Park Lincoln and Lou Diamond Phillips.

Roarke died in Euless, Texas, of an apparent heart attack.

Personal life

In 1989 Roarke married Carla DeLane and they had one child together. A child from Roarke's previous marriage, Jordan Gerler, was also an actor, appearing in Rolling Thunder in 1977.

Filmography 

 13 West Street (1962) - Jack
 The Virginian
 episode A Portrait of Marie Valonne (1963) - Jimmy Raker
 Kraft Suspense Theatre
 episode Are There Any More Out There Like You? (1963) - Paul Durbin
 Arrest and Trial
 episode The Best There Is (1964) - Sergeant Kelliher
 The Alfred Hitchcock Hour
 episode A Matter of Murder (1964) - Al (credited as Jordan Grant)
 episode The Sign of Satan (1964) - Ed Walsh
 Ensign Pulver (1964) - Mechanic (uncredited)
 Fluffy (1965) - Bob Brighton
 The Man from U.N.C.L.E.
 episode The Foxes and Hounds Affair (1965) - Cantrell
 Twelve O'Clock High
 episode I Am the Enemy (1965) - Capt. Davis
 Star Trek: The Original Series
 episode The Cage (1966) - as C.P.O. Garrison (uncredited)
 Women of the Prehistoric Planet (1966) - Harris
 The Road West
 episode Ashes and Tallow and One True Love (1966) - Hanson
 Cyborg 2087 (1966) - Deputy Dan
 El Dorado (1966) - Matt MacDonald
 Hells Angels on Wheels (1967) - Buddy
 Psych-Out (1968) - Ben
 The Savage Seven (1968) - Kisum
 The Mod Squad
 episode The Guru (1968) - Rick Potter
 Hell's Belles (1969) - Tampa
 Nam's Angels (1970) - Duke
 A Bullet for Pretty Boy (1970) - 'Preacher'
 Frogs (1972) -Clint Crockett
 Play It as It Lays (1972) - Carter Lang
 Medical Center
 episode Night Cry (1973) - Michael
 This Is a Hijack (1973) - Mike Christie
 Slaughter's Big Rip-Off (1973) - Harry (uncredited)
 Dirty Mary, Crazy Larry (1974) - Deke Sommers
 How Come Nobody's on Our Side? (1975) - Parson
 The Four Deuces (1976) - Russ Timmons, the Reporter
 The Keegans (1976, TV Movie) - Larry Keegan
 Hughes and Harlow: Angels in Hell - Howard Hawks
 Return from Witch Mountain (1978) - Museum security guard (uncredited)
 The Hardy Boys Mysteries
 episode Life on the Line (1979) - Willie Osborne
 The Stunt Man (1980) - Raymond Bailey
 CHiPs 
 episode Home Fires Burning (1981) - Ray Evans
 The Beach Girls (1982) - Carl Purdue
 And They Are Off (1982) - Dale Campbell
 Trespasses (1986) - The Drifters
 Slipping Into Darkness (1988) - Sheriff
 Dangerous Touch (1994) - Robert Turner
 Sioux City (1994) - Douglas Goldman (final film role)

Director 
 Trespasses (1986)

References

External links
 

1937 births
1996 deaths
American male film actors
American male television actors
Male actors from New York City
20th-century American male actors
People from Brooklyn